Edward Frederick Clarke (April 24, 1850 – March 3, 1905) was a Canadian journalist and political figure. He was Mayor of Toronto for four one-year terms, from 1888 until 1891 while also representing Toronto in the Legislative Assembly of Ontario from 1886 to 1894 and West Toronto from 1896 to 1904 and Toronto Centre from 1904 to 1905 in the House of Commons of Canada as a Conservative member. He attempted to regain the mayoralty in 1900 but was defeated by Ernest A. Macdonald. He was also a member of the Orange Order in Canada.

He was born in Bailieboro, County Cavan, Ireland in 1850, the son of merchant Richard Clarke, and came to Toronto in 1864 after the death of his father. He apprenticed as a printer with the Toronto Globe, later working with The Toronto Mail. In 1872, he was one of the leaders of a printers' strike in the city. Clarke was the editor and publisher of the Sentinel, a weekly newspaper associated with the Orange Order, which was widely distributed throughout North America between 1877 and 1896. In 1884, he married Charlotte Elizabeth Scott. He also served as the manager of the Excelsior Life Insurance Company of Toronto.

He died at home in Toronto in 1905 from heart failure. He had been suffering from pneumonia in the weeks leading up to his death.

References

External links 
 
 
The Canadian parliamentary companion, 1897 JA Gemmill
Commemorative biographical record of the county of York, Ontario ... (1907)

1850 births
1905 deaths
Conservative Party of Canada (1867–1942) MPs
Members of the House of Commons of Canada from Ontario
Progressive Conservative Party of Ontario MPPs
Mayors of Toronto
Canadian people of Ulster-Scottish descent
Irish emigrants to pre-Confederation Ontario
Immigrants to the Province of Canada
Canadian newspaper editors